HD 47475 (HR 2445) is a solitary star located in the southern constellation Columba. With an apparent magnitude of 6.34, its barely visible to the naked eye under ideal conditions. The star is located 1,720 light years away from the Solar System, but is drifting away with a heliocentric radial velocity of 15.77 km/s.

Properties
HD 47475 has a classification of K0 II, which states its a bright giant that has exhausted hydrogen at its core and left the main sequence. It has four times the Sun's mass, but has expanded to 45 times the Sun's radius. HD 47475 has a projected rotational velocity of 5 km/s, which is fast for its class.

References

047475
K-type bright giants
2445
031603
Durchmusterung objects
Columba (constellation)
Columbae, 111